The egg tart is a kind of custard tart found in Chinese cuisine derived from the English custard tart and Portuguese pastel de nata. The dish consists of an outer pastry crust filled with egg custard. Egg tarts are often served at dim sum restaurants, bakeries and cha chaan tengs (Hong Kong-style cafes).

History
The egg tart started being sold in the early 20th century in Guangzhou (Canton), Guangdong province, inspired by some kinds of European custard tart. Guangzhou's status as the only port accessible to European foreign traders led to the development of Cantonese cuisine having many outside influences. As Guangzhou's economy grew from trade and interaction with European powers, pastry chefs at the Western-style department stores in the city were “pressured to come up with new and exciting items to attract customers”. So egg tart varieties, inspired by those from Europe, featuring a lard-based puff pastry crust and a filling similar to steamed egg pudding (燉蛋), were then created by department stores and appeared as a "Weekly Special". Nowadays, there are two main varieties of egg tart in China. One that appeared around 1927 in Guangzhou’s Zhen Guang Restaurant (真光酒樓) is close to the egg tarts popular in Guangzhou and Hong Kong today. The other one is from Macau and is influenced by the pastel de nata as Macau was then a Portuguese colony.

Variations

Hong Kong 

Egg tarts were introduced to Hong Kong via Guangzhou in the 1940s but initially could only be found in higher-end Western-style restaurants. In the 1960s, cha chaan tengs began to serve egg tarts, popularizing the pastry with the working-class Hong Kong population.

Hong Kong egg tarts are typically smaller and served in twos or threes, in contrast to the original Guangzhou egg tarts which were larger and could be served as a single item. The custard filling may be flavored with chocolate, green tea, or bird's nest, and the outer shell may be made with pastry.

In June 2014, the technique of egg tart production was formally included in the Intangible Cultural Heritage Inventory of Hong Kong.

Macau
In 1989, British pharmacist Andrew Stow and his wife Margaret Wong opened Lord Stow's Bakery in Coloane, where they sold a Macau-style egg tart that attempted to recreate the pastel de nata. This variation is referred to as "Portuguese tart" in Chinese. In 1999, Wong sold the recipe to KFC, which then introduced the Macau-style pastel de nata to other parts of Asia, including Singapore and Taiwan.

In contrast to the Hong Kong-style egg tart, the Macau-style egg tart features a caramelized browned top.

See also

 Custard tart
 Egg pie
 Dim sum
 Flan
 Pastel de nata
 List of custard desserts
 List of egg dishes
 Meringue tart
 Pastry
 Put chai ko
 Quiche

References

External links

British fusion cuisine
Chinese fusion cuisine
Custard desserts
Egg dishes
Hong Kong cuisine
Hong Kong desserts
Macanese cuisine
Portuguese fusion cuisine
Singaporean cuisine
Tarts
Macanese desserts